Papulotranslucent acrokeratoderma may refer to:
 Keratosis punctata palmaris et plantaris
 Aquagenic wrinkling of the palms

Palmoplantar keratodermas